Metathrinca fopingensis is a moth in the family Xyloryctidae. It was described by Wang, Zheng and Li in 2000. It is found in China (Shaanxi).

References

Metathrinca
Moths described in 2000